Georg Karl de Scallon (tr. ; 24 October 
1847 – 1 February 1914) was a Russian general of Huguenot origin, Governor-general of Warsaw and the commander-in-chief of the Warsaw Military District from 1905 to 1914.

In 1903 he became the general-aide of the court of the Tsar Nicholas II. In 1905 was promoted to a general of cavalry as well as the general-governor of Warsaw. During the Russian Revolution of 1905 he introduced a martial law (on 10 November) and gave orders that led to brutal dispersion of crowds protesting in several Polish cities, with many fatalities among the civilian demonstrators. For that, the Polish Socialist Party decided to assassinate him. On 18 August 1906 Organizacja Bojowa PPS tried to kill him with two bombs thrown at his carriage (by Wanda Krahelska), but he survived.

In 1882 Scallon married Baroness Marie von Korff. She was daughter of the Colonel of the Imperial Russian Cuirassier Regiment, Baron Joseph Kasimir Alexander von Korff (1829–1873) and Anna Myasnikova. Granddaughter of the General of the Artillery, Baron Nikolaus Johann Rudolf von Korff (1793–1869).

He was awarded Order of Prince Danilo I and a number of other decorations.

References 

1847 births
1914 deaths
Imperial Russian Army generals
Governors-General of Warsaw
Russian people of French descent
Assassinated politicians of the Russian Empire